Elmira Huseynovna Glubokovskaya (born 20 April 1957) is a Russian political and public figure. Avar by nationality, she was elected to the 5th State Duma in 2007 from the political party Just Russia. She was elected to the 6th State Duma in 2011 from the United Russia party.

Career 
Glubokovskaya studied at Dagestan State Medical University. She worked in Vladimir Babichev's office as deputy chief of his secretariat.

Personal life 
Her daughter Roza Chemeris was elected to the State Duma in 2021.

References 

Living people
1957 births
Avar people
21st-century Russian women politicians
Dagestan State Medical University alumni
Fifth convocation members of the State Duma (Russian Federation)
Sixth convocation members of the State Duma (Russian Federation)
20th-century Russian physicians